Román Solís Zelaya ( – 20 August 2022) was a Costa Rican jurist who served as a justice of the Supreme Court.

References

1950s births
2022 deaths
Costa Rican jurists